William Fulton Kivlichan (11 March 1886 – 5 April 1937) was a Scottish footballer who played mainly as an outside right. He played for both of the Old Firm rival clubs Rangers and Celtic in the early 1900s.

Career
Born in Galashiels in the Scottish Borders, Kivlichan initially played for local clubs in the Dumfries area and signed for Rangers in 1905 via Glasgow University where he was an undergraduate in medicine; he played 24 games for the Ibrox club in two years. He was one of several players of the Catholic faith to feature for Rangers in the pre-World War I era, after which an unwritten rule was introduced at the club which persisted for several decades.

He transferred to Celtic in 1907 in an exchange deal involving fellow forward Alec Bennett and spent four seasons with the club, winning three Scottish Football League titles, a Glasgow Cup (1909) and a Scottish Cup (1911); he also represented the Scottish League XI three times while at Celtic, and came into consideration for a full cap for Scotland when he played in the Home Scots v Anglo-Scots trial match of 1910. After moving to England with Bradford (Park Avenue) he featured regularly for three seasons up to the outbreak of the First World War.

During the war, Kivlichan served as a lieutenant in the Royal Army Medical Corps, attached to the King's African Rifles. After he qualified in medicine from the University of Glasgow, Kivlichan became the Celtic team doctor. He was by the side of John Thomson as the young goalkeeper died from an injury sustained in an Old Firm match on 5 September 1931.

Kivlichan died on 5 April 1937 of heart disease at the age of 51.

See also
Played for Celtic and Rangers

References

Scottish footballers
Rangers F.C. players
Celtic F.C. players
Scottish people of Irish descent
People from Galashiels
Sportspeople from the Scottish Borders
1886 births
1937 deaths
British Army personnel of World War I
Royal Army Medical Corps officers
Alumni of the University of Glasgow
Scottish Football League players
Scottish Football League representative players
20th-century Scottish medical doctors
Celtic F.C. non-playing staff
Bradford (Park Avenue) A.F.C. players
English Football League players
Queen of the South F.C. players
Association football outside forwards
Association football forwards
Glasgow University F.C. players